Ricardo Filipe Barros Rodrigues (born 27 April 1990), known as Barros, is a Portuguese professional footballer who plays for Valadares Gaia FC as a centre forward.

Club career
Born in Paços de Brandão, Santa Maria da Feira, Barros spent his entire youth career with CD Paços de Brandão in his hometown before making his senior debut with third division club S.C. Espinho in 2009. He continued no higher than that level with SC São João de Ver and C.S. Marítimo B, before signing a one-year contract with Segunda Liga side C.D. Feirense in June 2013, after the exit of Jorge Pires.

After two years down a level at Sport Benfica e Castelo Branco and Sertanense FC, Barros returned to the second league in July 2015 by joining Leixões SC. He scored a career-best 11 goals for the team from Matosinhos, earning him a move to C.D. Cova da Piedade for the following season.

In February 2017, Barros moved abroad for the first time, signing a two-year deal with Gwangju FC of South Korea. He made only one K League 1 appearance, playing 56 minutes of a 2–0 away loss against Pohang Steelers before being substituted with an adductor muscle injury; in May, he told his country's TVI 24 that while he was financially better off in Asia, he disliked the culture of longer working hours.

Leixões brought Barros back to his homeland's second tier in June 2017, on a three-year deal. Injured in September, he had surgery on his right ankle in November, and was ruled out for a further four months. On 4 October 2018, having played one league match in the campaign, he reached an agreement with his employer to cancel his contract.

Days after severing his link, Barros signed for Varzim S.C. of the same league on a deal effective from January 2019. In July, having contributed two goals in 19 games to stave off relegation, he earned another year at the Estádio do Varzim SC.

On 6 February 2020, shortly after having become a free agent, Barros moved to third-division Valadares Gaia FC.

References

External links

1990 births
Living people
Sportspeople from Santa Maria da Feira
Portuguese footballers
Association football forwards
Liga Portugal 2 players
Segunda Divisão players
S.C. Espinho players
SC São João de Ver players
C.D. Feirense players
Sport Benfica e Castelo Branco players
Sertanense F.C. players
Leixões S.C. players
C.D. Cova da Piedade players
Varzim S.C. players
K League 1 players
Gwangju FC players
Portuguese expatriate footballers
Expatriate footballers in South Korea
Portuguese expatriate sportspeople in South Korea